"River" is a song by Canadian singer songwriter Joni Mitchell, from her 1971 album Blue. Written on piano, it has become a standard for artists in many music styles, and has become popular as Christmas music. Although never released as a single, "River" holds second place among Mitchell's songs most recorded by other artists. In 2021, it was ranked at No. 247 on Rolling Stone's "Top 500 Best Songs of All Time".

Background and composition 
The song is about the recent breakup of a romantic relationship, with the singer longing to escape her painful emotional bonds. It is thought to be inspired by Mitchell's 1968–1970 relationship with Graham Nash. Although the song is merely set near Christmas time, rather than being about Christmas, it has become something of a modern Christmas standard.  Writer Will Blythe believes the song is connected to a visit to Chapel Hill that Mitchell made with then beau James Taylor and a caroling session with his family, the Taylor family, and Mitchell.

The piano accompaniment to the vocal borrows heavily from the tune to the 19th-century winter song "Jingle Bells".

Cover versions 
"River" is the second-most widely recorded song in Mitchell's oeuvre (432 recordings, behind only "Both Sides, Now"), frequently appearing on albums of Christmas music by pop, folk and jazz artists.

"River" was covered by Barry Manilow on his 2002 album A Christmas Gift of Love with only one verse change involving a gender flip. It charted as a single at No. 17 on the U.S. Adult Contemporary charts.

Robert Downey Jr sang a version of this song on the 4th series of the TV show Ally McBeal and it was later included on the album A Very Ally Christmas by Vonda Shepherd 

Sarah McLachlan also covered it on her 2006 album Wintersong and released it as a single. Her cover charted at No. 71 on the Billboard Hot 100, No. 8 on the Billboard Adult Contemporary chart, and number two on the Canadian Singles Chart. American singer-songwriter James Taylor covered the song for his 2006 studio album, entitled James Taylor at Christmas. He had first heard the song when Joni Mitchell played it for him at her house in 1970.  American jazz singer Madeleine Peyroux recorded it as a duet with k. d. lang for her 2006 album Half the Perfect World.

In 2017, Sam Smith covered the song as part of Spotify's Spotify Singles series. Smith's version was recorded at RAK Studios in London, England.

In December 2018 the song was the subject of an episode of BBC Radio 4's Soul Music, examining the song's influence on people including Mitchell's biographer David Yaffe. Ben Platt, as his character, Payton Hobart, performed the song during the first episode of the series The Politician (2019), and on the soundtrack associated with the show. A cover by Judy Collins appears on her 2019 album Winter Stories. In the 1998 movie You’ve Got Mail the Kathleen Kelly character, played by Meg Ryan, sub-vocalizes the song's opening lines as she types an email to the character played by Tom Hanks: It's coming on Christmas, "They're cutting down trees You know that Joni Mitchell song? I wish I had a river I could skate away on ... Such a sad song, and not really about Christmas at all but I was thinking about it tonight as I was decorating my Christmas tree …"

On 27 December 2019, a version of the song by Ellie Goulding reached number one on the UK Singles Chart, making it the last number-one song of the decade.

In 2020, Delta Goodrem covered this song and gave it a video on her Christmas album Only Santa Knows.

On November 26th, 2021, Australian singer-songwriter Gretta Ray released a cover of "River" as part of her three-song Christmas EP It's Almost Christmas in Philly.

Among other artists to cover this song, are Sixpence None the Richer, Olivia Rodrigo, Tracey Thorn, Lighthouse Family and Harry Styles.

Charts

Certifications

Glee version
The song was covered by the cast of Glee in 2011.

Charts

Ellie Goulding version

English singer and songwriter Ellie Goulding released a cover version of the song as a single on 14 November 2019 exclusively on Amazon Music. The song peaked at number one on the UK Singles Chart.

Background
In an interview with Billboard earlier in the year, Goulding spoke of her love for Joni Mitchell in the past, she named her as one of the first songwriters she fell in love with in her youth. She said, "Only when I got into my teens did I discover song-writing, that was when I learned the guitar, and I listened to Imogen Heap and Björk, Ani DiFranco and especially Joni Mitchell." On her social media, she said, "Joni was one of the reasons I wanted to be a songwriter. I'm honoured to have had the opportunity to cover this song."

Music video
A music video to accompany the release of "River" was first released onto YouTube on 4 December 2019. The music video was directed by David Soutar and filmed along the coastline near Dungeness. It shows Goulding and her friends picking up litter and recycled objects to make a zero-waste Christmas tree. The tree was donated to The Village Prep School in North London for the Christmas season, before being deconstructed and re-used. Goulding said, "Shooting the video in Dungeness was beautiful but a timely reminder that every single piece of plastic ever made is still on this planet. Plastic stuff is everywhere and our coastlines are suffering horrendously. It's a material that will last for hundreds of years so we need to have a plan. We wanted to show something different and to incorporate a different type of Christmas message while creating something reusable and beautiful - I'm so happy that it will live on at the Village Prep School, hopefully visiting many more schools to come."

Charts

On 27 December 2019, the song reached number one on the UK Singles Chart, making it the last number-one song of the decade.

The single was not released onto most common download or streaming platforms, and only available through Amazon Music and YouTube. Music industry analysts noted that it reached the top of the charts primarily on the back of passive "lean back" streams; Amazon added the song to their Christmas playlists, meaning that "River" was played whenever someone asked an Amazon Alexa smart speaker to play Christmas songs.

Certifications

References

External links
 Full lyrics at Joni Mitchell's official site.
 

1971 songs
Joni Mitchell songs
Katie Melua songs
Sarah McLachlan songs
Barry Manilow songs
Ellie Goulding songs
Ben Platt songs
Christmas songs
Songs written by Joni Mitchell
Nettwerk Records singles
Polydor Records singles
Song recordings produced by Joni Mitchell
UK Singles Chart number-one singles
Songs about rivers